Gustav-Adolf Sjöberg (22 March 1865 – 31 October 1937) was a Swedish sport shooter who competed at the 1908 Summer Olympics. In 1908 he was a member of the Swedish team which won the silver medal in the free rifle team event. He also finished fourth in the 300 metre free rifle competition.

References

External links
profile

1865 births
1937 deaths
Swedish male sport shooters
ISSF rifle shooters
Olympic shooters of Sweden
Shooters at the 1908 Summer Olympics
Olympic silver medalists for Sweden
Olympic medalists in shooting
Medalists at the 1908 Summer Olympics
19th-century Swedish people
20th-century Swedish people